Halesus is a genus of caddisflies belonging to the family Limnephilidae.

The genus was first described by James Francis Stephens in 1836.

The species of this genus are found in Eurasia and Northern America.

Species:
 Halesus digitatus
 Halesus radiatus
 Halesus tesselatus

References

Integripalpia
Trichoptera genera